Levente Gödry (born 17 April 1992) is a Hungarian tennis player.

Gödry has a career high ATP singles ranking of 934 achieved on 25 August 2014. He also has a career high ATP doubles ranking of 512, achieved on 28 January 2019. Gödry has won 6 ITF doubles titles.
 
Gödry has represented Hungary at Davis Cup, where he has a win–loss record of 5–4.

Future and Challenger finals

Doubles 13 (6–7)

Davis Cup

Participations: (5–4)

   indicates the outcome of the Davis Cup match followed by the score, date, place of event, the zonal classification and its phase, and the court surface.

External links 
 
 
 

1992 births
Living people
Hungarian male tennis players
Tennis players from Budapest
20th-century Hungarian people
21st-century Hungarian people